WHOY (1210 AM) is a radio station broadcasting a Spanish variety format. It is licensed to Salinas, Puerto Rico, United States, and it serves the Puerto Rico area.  The station is owned by Martin Colon and its licensee is held by Colon Radio Corporation.

References

External links

HOY
Radio stations established in 1967
Salinas, Puerto Rico
1967 establishments in Puerto Rico